Hassocks & Victoria was an electoral division of West Sussex in the United Kingdom, and returned one member to sit on West Sussex County Council from 1997 to 2017.  In 2017 it was replaced by a new division, Hassocks & Burgess Hill South.

Extent
The division covered the southwestern part of the town of Burgess Hill and the villages of Clayton, Hassocks and Keymer.

It comprised the Mid Sussex District wards: Burgess Hill Victoria Ward and Hassocks Ward; and of the following civil parishes: the southwestern part of Burgess Hill, and Hassocks.

Election results

2013 Election
Results of the election held on 2 May 2013:

2009 Election
Results of the election held on 4 June 2009:

2005 Election
Results of the election held on 5 May 2005:

References
Election Results - West Sussex County Council

External links
 West Sussex County Council
 Election Maps

Electoral Divisions of West Sussex